Ndendé Airport  is an airport serving Ndendé, Ngounié Province, Gabon.

See also

 List of airports in Gabon
 Transport in Gabon

References

External links
The Margouilla - Ndende
Ndendé Airport
OurAirports - Ndendé

Airports in Gabon